Talcott Mountain Science Center for Student Involvement ("TMSC") is a not-for-profit 501c(3) corporation in Avon, Connecticut.  It is dedicated to the improvement of science education and does so by working directly with students, teachers, and the general public.

History 

TMSC was established in 1967 under a program of the U.S. Department of Education.  Its founders were part of the Avon Public School district and included Superintendent Francis Driscoll and science teachers Donald P. La Salle and George C. Atamian.  Its campus atop Talcott Mountain is a former Project Nike missile radar site ("HA-85") that formed part of the U.S. defenses during the Cold War.  Initially three small buildings and a guard shack, the Center today houses four main campus buildings with classrooms and laboratories, as well as a weather research station, two observatories, the largest teaching planetarium in Connecticut and - within the surrounding 15 miles - a large visible model of the solar system.

Activities 
The Center provides direct science education in schools in central Connecticut, online resources via the internet, teacher training in science methods, as well as public programs by appointment for students and adults on weekends and evenings, vacations and summers.

Courses include general science for younger students, and enrichment and student-based research in astronomy, chronobiology, computers, ecology, geology, green energy, magic & science, meteorology, music technology, robotics, and video production.

The Center produces curriculum for its own use as well as on a contracted basis for schools and projects.  It has originated a number of nationwide educational projects under the U.S. Department of Education and the National Science Foundation.  It has been an international consultant to overseas schools in Northern Africa, Eastern Europe and the Mediterranean region.

The Center houses the Talcott Mountain Academy for Science, Mathematics and Technology, a private independent co-educational day school centered on science and providing all academic subjects in grades K-8.

Notable alumni 
 Eric Fossum
 Steve Perlman

References

External links 
 Talcott Mountain Science Center
 Talcott Mountain Academy
 Former project Nike sites

Avon, Connecticut
Schools in Hartford County, Connecticut
Planetaria in the United States
Private middle schools in Connecticut
Private elementary schools in Connecticut
1967 establishments in Connecticut